Tahar Ben Hassen (born July 14, 1941), sometimes written as Tamar Ben Hassan, is a retired Tunisian boxer.

Olympics
Hassen competed in the 1960 Summer Olympics as a bantamweight.  He lost his first bout to Nicolae Puiu after receiving a first round bye.

Hassen also competed in the 1964 Summer Olympics as a featherweight.  He won is first bout against Peter Weiss, but lost his next bout against eventual silver medalist Anthony Villanueva.

Professional
As a professional Hassen lost to David Kotey for the African Boxing Union featherweight title. His record was 26 wins (15ko), 8 losses (5ko) and 3 draws.

References

External links

 Habib Galhia Olympic Database

1941 births
Olympic boxers of Tunisia
Boxers at the 1960 Summer Olympics
Boxers at the 1964 Summer Olympics
Living people
Tunisian male boxers
Bantamweight boxers
20th-century Tunisian people